Daniel Aranzubia Aguado (born 18 September 1979) is a Spanish former professional footballer who played as a goalkeeper, and the goalkeeper coach of Athletic Bilbao B.

He appeared in 303 La Liga matches during 13 seasons, with Athletic Bilbao – in whose youth system he grew – Deportivo and Atlético Madrid. With the second club, he scored one goal in the competition.

Aranzubia represented Spain at Euro 2004.

Playing career

Club

Athletic Bilbao
Born in Logroño, La Rioja, but nonetheless a product of Athletic Bilbao's famed youth academy at Lezama, Aranzubia made his first-team debut on 10 June 2001 in a 1–3 home derby loss against Real Sociedad. After two seasons as backup to Iñaki Lafuente, he emerged as the side's undisputed starter, helping them qualify to the UEFA Cup in 2004 while extending his contract a further four years.

After additional struggles for first-choice duties with Lafuente in the 2005–06 campaign, Aranzubia was definitely deemed surplus to requirements by the Basques after the emergence of Gorka Iraizoz, not appearing even when the first-choice was severely injured during 2007–08 (Athletic received veteran Armando on loan from Cádiz CF, and he became the starter).

Deportivo
On 13 July 2008, Aranzubia joined Deportivo de La Coruña on a three-year deal, helping the Galicians to the UEFA Intertoto Cup and starting throughout the entire season, save one match due to suspension. On 2 October, he saved three penalties in a shootout against SK Brann in a UEFA Cup first round 2–0 home win, with Depor thus reaching the group stage.

Aranzubia missed the first six games of the 2010–11 campaign due to injury, but again finished as a starter for Deportivo. On 20 February 2011, he scored with his head after a 95th-minute corner kick as his team managed a 1–1 draw at UD Almería, becoming the first goalkeeper in La Liga history to score from open play.

Atlético Madrid
In August 2013, Aranzubia signed for Atlético Madrid as a backup to Thibaut Courtois. He made his debut in the UEFA Champions League on 11 December 2013 shortly after his 34th birthday, saving a penalty from FC Porto's Josué in a 2–0 group stage home victory.

As the Belgian was unavailable due to injury, Aranzubia first played in the league with the Colchoneros on 8 February 2014, being sent off in the last minutes of a 0–2 loss at Almería after fouling Jonathan Zongo in the box. He finished his spell at the Vicente Calderón Stadium with five competitive appearances.

International
Aranzubia made his only appearance for Spain on 5 June 2004, in a friendly match with Andorra at the Coliseum Alfonso Pérez. He came on as a substitute for Santiago Cañizares, who had already replaced Iker Casillas, at the hour-mark, after having been selected as third-choice for the UEFA Euro 2004 tournament.

Previously, Aranzubia helped the nation win the 1999 FIFA World Youth Championship and finish runner-up at the 2000 Summer Olympics, starting in both finals.

Coaching career
In the summer of 2016, Aranzubia was hired as a goalkeeper coach for SD Amorebieta under manager Aitor Larrazábal. Three years later, in the same capacity, he joined his former teammate Joseba Etxeberria's staff at Athletic Bilbao B.

Club statistics

Honours

Club
Basconia
Tercera División: 1997–98

Deportivo
UEFA Intertoto Cup: 2008
Segunda División: 2011–12

Atlético Madrid
La Liga: 2013–14
UEFA Champions League runner-up: 2013–14
Supercopa de España runner-up: 2013

International
Spain U20
FIFA World Youth Championship: 1999

Spain U23
Summer Olympic silver medal: 2000

References

External links

Atlético Madrid official profile

Deportivo official profile 

1979 births
Living people
Sportspeople from Logroño
Spanish footballers
Footballers from La Rioja (Spain)
Association football goalkeepers
La Liga players
Segunda División players
Segunda División B players
Tercera División players
CD Basconia footballers
Bilbao Athletic footballers
Athletic Bilbao footballers
Deportivo de La Coruña players
Atlético Madrid footballers
Spain youth international footballers
Spain under-21 international footballers
Spain under-23 international footballers
Spain international footballers
UEFA Euro 2004 players
Olympic footballers of Spain
Olympic silver medalists for Spain
Footballers at the 2000 Summer Olympics
Olympic medalists in football
Medalists at the 2000 Summer Olympics